East Garafraxa is a rural township located in Dufferin County, Ontario, Canada, to the west of Orangeville and within relative commuting distance of Toronto, Brampton, Guelph, and Kitchener.

While it is unknown how the name "Garafraxa" came to be, there are a number of theories to its origins:
It is derived from an Indigeous word meaning "panther country"
Commemorating an old Irish estate or castle
From the Scottish stream, the River Garry
From Gaelic fraoch garbh meaning "rough heath"
From local botany Saxifrage or Sassafras
Old English word gara or gar means either a small triangular piece of land or cloth as in a sail, and the Township could be considered part fracta of the Gore, or Gara

East Garafraxa is known for, among other things, its scenic spots, and many people go there to escape from the city.

Communities
The township of East Garafraxa comprises a number of villages and hamlets, including the following communities such as Craigsholme, Depew's Corners, Hereward, Marsville, McKee's Corner, North Erin (partially), Orton (partially), Portadown, Price's Corners, Reading, Rogertown, The Maples; Glenmorrow, Leeson's Corners, The Grove.

Demographics

According to the 2011 Canadian Census, the median age was 42.9 years old, a bit higher than the national median at 40.6 years old. According to the 2011 National Household Survey, the median value of a dwelling in East Garafraxa is $500,226, higher than the national average at $280,552. The median household income (after-taxes) in East Garafraxa is $95,069, much higher than the national average at $54,089.

East Garafraxa is mostly made up of European descents. According to the 2016 Census, the racial make up of East Garafraxa is:
 90.5% White
 3.7% South Asian
 3.9% Aboriginal; 3.1% First Nations, 0.8% Metis
 1.9% Other

See also
List of townships in Ontario

References

External links

Lower-tier municipalities in Ontario
Municipalities in Dufferin County
Township municipalities in Ontario
1869 establishments in Ontario